Norberto Constante Boggio (11 August 1931 – 20 December 2021) was an Argentine footballer who played as a forward for Argentina in the 1958 FIFA World Cup. At club level, he played for Banfield, San Lorenzo de Almagro and Mexican club Atlante. Boggio died on 20 December 2021, at the age of 90.

References

External links
 FIFA profile

1931 births
2021 deaths
Argentine footballers
Association football forwards
Argentina international footballers
1958 FIFA World Cup players
Club Atlético Banfield footballers
San Lorenzo de Almagro footballers
Atlante F.C. footballers
Argentine Primera División players
Liga MX players
Argentine expatriate footballers
Argentine expatriate sportspeople in Mexico
Expatriate footballers in Mexico
Footballers from Santa Fe, Argentina